The 1975–76 Romanian Hockey League season was the 46th season of the Romanian Hockey League. Four teams participated in the league, and Dinamo Bucuresti won the championship.

Final round

External links
hochei.net

Romania
Romanian Hockey League seasons
Rom